Ash-e doogh (or , romanized: Dovga ashi) is a yogurt soup found in various parts of Iran, such as Azerbaijan and Shiraz, with differing but similar ingredients. Similar dishes are found all over West Asia.

Etymology
The spelling of the name of this dish varies in English and can include ash-e dugh. There are some alternative terms for this soup, including ash-e mast.

Ingredients
Ash-e doogh is a soup usually made with yogurt or doogh, as well as different kind of herbs (such as coriander, leek, tarragon, mint, and parsley), vegetables (such as spinach, purslane, chickpeas, peas, onion and garlic), lamb meatballs, eggs, rice, salt and several types of spices. Fried mint with oil (and sometime garlic) is used as a topping for the soup. This soup can be made vegetarian.

Variations
Some people prefer to make this soup with yogurt whereas others prefer doogh, a savory soda yogurt. The soup is made with sweet yogurt, while the soda yogurt is sour.  

There is a very similar Assyrian dish called bushala, which is similar soup to ash-e-doogh in that it also contains yogurt and green vegetables. Bushala is consumed by Assyrian people of Iran and Iraq, though it may feature some different ingredients.

See also 
 List of soups
 List of yogurt-based dishes and beverages
 Āsh, a genre of soup dishes from Iran
 Ash reshteh, Iranian noodle soup
 Dovga, a similar Azerbaijani yogurt soup
 Tarator, a similar Balkans dish
 Toyga soup, a similar Turkish soup

References

Iranian soups
Assyrian cuisine